Nadjadji Anwar (born in Gresik, East Java, on 13 January 1954) is a professor in the Department of Civil Engineering of Institut Teknologi Sepuluh Nopember (ITS). He is also known as a consultant of water resources engineering which is his main expertise. In accordance with his expertise, he took office as the chairman of the East Java branch of Indonesian hydraulic engineering expert association (HATHI). In Institut Teknologi Sepuluh Nopember (ITS), he used to serve as the Dean of the Faculty of Civil Engineering and Planning, and also the first chairman of Institut Teknologi Sepuluh Nopember (ITS)' Board of Professors.

Early life
Although was born in Gresik, Nadjadji Anwar grew up in Malang where he took his primary education. As a child, he attended the Malang Muhammadiyah 1 Elementary School during the period of 1961 to 1966. Afterward, he went to IV Malang State Junior High School from 1967 to 1969 and Malang III State Senior High School from 1970 to 1972. After finishing his primary and middle education, Nadjadji Anwar later moved to Bandung to continue his study at Institut Teknologi Bandung (ITB), where he later earned his Engineer Degree in 1979. Later on, he went to the United States to pursue his Master of Science (M.Sc.) at Colorado State University which he later achieved in 1982. Afterward, he pursued his Doctoral Degree and earned it from Tokyo University in 1998.

Career
He began his career as a lecturer in the Department of Civil Engineering of Institut Teknologi Sepuluh Nopember (ITS). During his career in Institut Teknologi Sepuluh Nopember (ITS) he used to serve as the Dean of the Faculty of Civil Engineering and Planning for seven years. He also participated in the 2010 rector election but lose to Professor Tri Yogi Yuwono.

References

Living people
Academic staff of Sepuluh Nopember Institute of Technology
1954 births
Indonesian civil engineers